The Orem Owlz were a Minor League Baseball team located in Orem, Utah, United States, from 2001 to 2020. The team competed in the Pioneer League as a Rookie League affiliate of the Los Angeles Angels. The Owlz played their home games at Home of the Owlz on the campus of Utah Valley University. They were previously known as the Provo Angels from 2001 to 2004.

In conjunction with a contraction of Minor League Baseball in 2021, the Pioneer League, of which the Owlz had been members since 2001, was converted from an MLB-affiliated Rookie Advanced league to an independent baseball league and granted status as an MLB Partner League. Concurrent to this change, the Owlz relocated to Windsor, Colorado, and became the Northern Colorado Owlz.

History
Formerly known as the Provo Angels (2001–2004), the team originally played at the Larry H. Miller Field on the campus of Brigham Young University in northeastern Provo. After the 2004 season, the team changed ownership and moved from Provo to a new stadium in neighboring Orem. While retaining its affiliation with the Angels Major League Baseball club, the team introduced a new name and logo at the time of their move. The Owlz also introduced a new mascot named Hootz, a red owl with a head in the shape of a large baseball. Hootz was married in 2009 in an on-field ceremony to Holly, a female owl. According to team lore, the two Mascot Owlz lived in an abandoned oak tree that was offered by an Orem host family.

The Owlz played in the Pioneer League, which was a Rookie League with an abbreviated schedule (short-season). The team won five Pioneer League titles; one while in Provo (2004), and four while in Orem (2005, 2007, 2009, and 2016). With its championship victory in 2016, the Orem Owlz became the quickest franchise in Pioneer League history to win five championships, doing so in just 17 years. The team also finished first in the South Division of the Pioneer League eight times.

The team is prominently mentioned in the book Odd Man Out: A Year on the Mound with a Minor League Misfit, a memoir recounting the author's one season playing for the Provo Angels.

Team owner Jeff Katofsky planned to relocate the team to Pueblo, Colorado, in 2020, where they would be known as the Pueblo Owlz, but the plan was abandoned due to financial concerns by the city of Pueblo.

Ultimately, they relocated to Windsor, Colorado, in 2021 and became the Northern Colorado Owlz. This move was made in conjunction with a contraction of Minor League Baseball in 2021 in which the Pioneer League was converted from an MLB-affiliated Rookie Advanced league to an independent baseball league and granted status as an MLB Partner League.

Playoffs

 2017: Lost to Ogden 2–0 in semifinals.
 2016: Defeated Ogden 2–1 in semifinals; defeated Billings 2–0 to win championship.
 2015: Lost to Idaho Falls 2–1 in semifinals.
 2014: Defeated Ogden 2–0 in semifinals; lost to Billings 2–0 in finals.
 2011: Lost to Ogden 2–1 in semifinals.
 2010: Lost to Ogden 2–1 in semifinals.
 2009: Defeated Ogden 2–0 in semifinals; defeated Missoula 2–1 to win championship.
 2008: Lost to Great Falls 2–1 in finals.
 2007: Defeated Great Falls 2–0 to win championship.
 2005: Defeated Helena 2–0 to win championship.
 2004: Defeated Billings 2–0 to win championship.
 2003: Lost to Billings 2–0 in finals.
 2002: Lost to Great Falls 2–1 in finals.
 2001: Lost to Billings 2–0 in finals.

All-stars

Players with MLB experience
Players are listed by the season(s) they played for the Provo Angels (2001–2004) or Orem Owlz (2005–present).

See also

 Orem Owlz players
 Provo Angels players

References

External links

 
 Baseball Reference – Orem teams
 Baseball Reference – Provo teams

Los Angeles Angels minor league affiliates
Los Angeles Angels of Anaheim minor league affiliates
Anaheim Angels minor league affiliates
Defunct Pioneer League (baseball) teams
Professional baseball teams in Utah
Owlz
Baseball teams established in 2001
Baseball teams disestablished in 2020
Sports in Orem, Utah
2001 establishments in Utah
2020 disestablishments in Utah
Defunct baseball teams in Utah